Ffa Coffi Pawb (Welsh: "Everybody's Coffee Beans", phonetically Welsh: "Fuck Off, Everyone" ) was a band signed to Welsh music label, Ankst, active from 1986 to 1992.

The band was made up of singer and guitarist Gruff Rhys (later of Super Furry Animals), drummer Dafydd Ieuan (also later of Super Furry Animals), Rhodri Puw (later of Gorky's Zygotic Mynci) and Dewi Emlyn (later tour manager for Gorky's Zygotic Mynci and Super Furry Animals). One of the band's tracks, "Dacw Hi", was eventually covered by the Furries on their Welsh language album Mwng.

The band released three albums, Clymhalio, Dalec Peilon and Hei Vidal!. In 2004, a compilation drawn from their albums was released under the title Am Byth ("Forever") on the Placid Casual label, with renewed interest from the success of Super Furry Animals.

Discography
Studio albums
Dalec Peilon (1988)
Clymhalio (1991)
Hei Vidal! (1992)

Compilation albums
Am Byth (2004)

Singles
 "Gwanwyn Yn Detroit" (1989)
 "Cymryd y Pys" (1992)

References

External links
 Ffa Coffi Pawb biography from BBC Wales
 Placid Casual
 Ffa Coffi Pawb @ WelshBands

Welsh-language bands
Welsh alternative rock groups
Welsh indie rock groups
Neo-psychedelia groups
Super Furry Animals